The 1981–82 Liga Leumit season saw Hapoel Kfar Saba win their first, and to date only title. Oded Machnes of runners-up Maccabi Netanya was the league's top scorer with 26 goals. Hapoel Rishon LeZion, Beitar Tel Aviv and Hapoel Petah Tikva were all relegated.

Final table

Results

References
Israel - List of final tables RSSSF

Liga Leumit seasons
Israel
1